October 21 - Eastern Orthodox liturgical calendar - October 23

All fixed commemorations below celebrated on November 4 by Orthodox Churches on the Old Calendar.

For October 22nd, Orthodox Churches on the Old Calendar commemorate the Saints listed on October 9.

From the Synaxarion
Saint Zacharias the Martyr, Orthodox martyr, by drowning in the sea (either same as, or different from, saint commemorated on October 21st)

Saints
 Holy Equal-to-the-Apostles Abercius, Bishop and Wonderworker, of Hierapolis (167)
 Hieromartyr Alexander, Bishop, and Martyrs Heraclius, Anna, Elizabeth, Theodota, and Glyceria, at Adrianople (2nd-3rd centuries)
 The Holy Seven Youths ("Seven Sleepers") of Ephesus (250 and c. 446)  (see also:  August 4 )
 Martyr Theodoret, at Antioch (362)
 Venerables Lot and Rufus, of Egypt (5th century)
 Saint Eulavios, Bishop of Lambousa (ancient Lapithos).

Pre-Schism Western saints
 Saint Philip of Fermo, Bishop and martyr of Fermo in Italy (c. 270)
 Saint Mellonius (Mellon), first Bishop of Rouen (314)
 Saint Nepotianus, Bishop of Clermont in France (c. 388)
 Saint Verecundus (Verecondo), Bishop of Verona in Italy (522)
 Saint Simplicius, a disciple of St Benedict and third Abbot of Montecassino (c. 570)
 Saint Maroveus, a monk at Bobbio Abbey and founder of the monastery of Precipiano near Tortona in Italy (650)
 Saint Nunctus (Noint), Abbot of a monastery near Mérida in the west of Spain, murdered by robbers and venerated as a martyr (668)
 Saint Moderan (Moderamnus, Moran), Bishop of Rennes, then became a hermit in Berceto in Italy (c. 730)
 Saint Benedict of Macerac (Benoît de Macérac), a Greek abbot who fled from Petras and settled in Macerac near Nantes in France (845)
 Saints Nunilo and Alodia, two sisters, a pair of child-martyrs from Huesca in Spain (851)
 Saint Bertharius, a Benedictine abbot of Monte Cassino, martyred together with several of his monks by invading Saracens (884)
 Saint Donatus of Fiesole, born in Ireland, he went on pilgrimage to Rome and became Bishop of Fiesole near Florence in Italy (874)

Post-Schism Orthodox saints
 Saints Theodore and Paul, Abbots, of Rostov (1409)
 Saint Gregory of Methoni, Bishop of Methoni in Greece and Ethnomartyr (1825)
 Saint George the New Confessor, of Drama, Greece (1959)  (see also: October 24 - Russian; November 4 - Greek)

New Martys and Confessors
 New Hieromartyrs(1937):
 Seraphim (Samoilovich), Archbishop of Uglich;
 Herman (Polyansky) and Menas (Shelaev), Archimandrites; 
 Alexander Lebedev, Vladimir Sobolev, Basil Bogoyavlensky, and Alexander Andreyev, Priests. 
 New Hieromartyrs Nicholas Bogoslovsky and Nicholas Ushakov, Priests (1937) 
 New Hieromartyr Gregory (Vorobiev), Abbot, of Koprino, Yaroslavl (1937)

Other commemorations
 The Kazan Icon of the Most Holy Theotokos (commemorating the deliverance from the Poles in 1612)
 Icons of the Mother of God "Andronikos" and "Jacobstadt" (17th century)
 Repose of Monk Joseph the Silent, of Kuban (1925)
 Repose of Metropolitan Nestor of Kamchatka and Petropavlovsk (1962)
 Repose of Protopresbyter Michael Pomazansky (1988)
 Uncovering of the relics (2012) of New Hieromartyr Nikodim (Kononov), Bishop of Belgorod (1918)  (see also: October 20 )

Icon gallery

Notes

References

Sources 
 October 22 / November 4. Orthodox Calendar (PRAVOSLAVIE.RU).
 November 4 / October 22. HOLY TRINITY RUSSIAN ORTHODOX CHURCH (A parish of the Patriarchate of Moscow).
 October 22. OCA - The Lives of the Saints.
 The Autonomous Orthodox Metropolia of Western Europe and the Americas (ROCOR). St. Hilarion Calendar of Saints for the year of our Lord 2004. St. Hilarion Press (Austin, TX). p. 79.
 The Twenty-Second Day of the Month of October. Orthodoxy in China.
 October 22. Latin Saints of the Orthodox Patriarchate of Rome.
 The Roman Martyrology. Transl. by the Archbishop of Baltimore. Last Edition, According to the Copy Printed at Rome in 1914. Revised Edition, with the Imprimatur of His Eminence Cardinal Gibbons. Baltimore: John Murphy Company, 1916. pp. 325–326.
 Rev. Richard Stanton. A Menology of England and Wales, or, Brief Memorials of the Ancient British and English Saints Arranged According to the Calendar, Together with the Martyrs of the 16th and 17th Centuries. London: Burns & Oates, 1892. pp. 510–511.
Greek Sources
 Great Synaxaristes:  22 ΟΚΤΩΒΡΙΟΥ. ΜΕΓΑΣ ΣΥΝΑΞΑΡΙΣΤΗΣ.
  Συναξαριστής. 22 Οκτωβρίου. ECCLESIA.GR. (H ΕΚΚΛΗΣΙΑ ΤΗΣ ΕΛΛΑΔΟΣ).
  22/10/2017. Ορθόδοξος Συναξαριστής. 
Russian Sources
  4 ноября (22 октября). Православная Энциклопедия под редакцией Патриарха Московского и всея Руси Кирилла (электронная версия). (Orthodox Encyclopedia - Pravenc.ru).
  22 октября по старому стилю / 4 ноября по новому стилю. Русская Православная Церковь - Православный церковный календарь на 2016 год.

October in the Eastern Orthodox calendar